
Year 529 (DXXIX) was a common year starting on Monday (link will display the full calendar) of the Julian calendar. At the time, it was known as the Year of the Consulship of Decius without colleague (or, less frequently, year 1282 Ab urbe condita). The denomination 529 for this year has been used since the early medieval period, when the Anno Domini calendar era became the prevalent method in Europe for naming years.

Events 
 By place 

 Byzantine Empire 
 April 7 – Emperor Justinian I issues the Codex Justinianus (Code of Civil Laws), reformulating Roman law in an effort to control his unruly people (see 532).
 The Samaritans revolt and are defeated; the Church of the Nativity is burnt down during the Rebellion.

 Europe 
 Queen Amalasuntha receives a delegation sent by a council of Gothic nobles urging that she have her son Athalaric, now 13, taught an education in the Roman tradition—not by elderly schoolmasters, but by men who will teach him to "ride, fence, and to be toughened, not to be turned into a bookworm".

 Arabia 
 Al-Harith ibn Jabalah becomes the fifth king of the Ghassanids. He helps the Byzantines to suppress the wide-scale Samaritan Revolt.

 Central America 
 February 25 – K'an Joy Chitam I becomes the new ruler of the Mayan city-state of Palenque what is now the state of Chiapas in southern Mexico, ending an interregnum of a little over four years, and reigns until his death in 565.

 Southeast Asia 
Rudravarman is granted investiture by China, as the first king of the fourth dynasty of Champa (modern Vietnam).

 By topic 

 Education 
 The Academy, originally founded at Athens by Plato around 387 BC, closes down by order of Justinian I, on charges of un-Christian activity. Many of the school's professors emigrate to Persia and Syria.

 Religion 
 The Benedictine Order is established at Monte Cassino near Naples by Benedict of Nursia, who founds a monastery and formulates for his monks strict rules in the "Regula Benedicti".
 The Canons of the Council of Orange are established, approving the  Augustinian doctrine of sin and grace over Pelagianism and Semi-Pelagianism, but without Augustine's absolute predestination.

Births 
 Wen Xuan Di, emperor of Northern Qi (d. 559)

Deaths 
 Baderic, king of the Thuringii (b. c. 480)
 Theodosius the Cenobiarch, monk and founder of the Monastery of St. Theodosius
 Yuan Hao, imperial prince of Northern Wei

References